Last Tango in Halifax is a British comedy-drama series that began broadcasting on BBC One on 20 November 2012 until its final episode which was broadcast on 15 March 2020. Screenwriter Sally Wainwright loosely adapted the story of her mother's second marriage. The series stars Derek Jacobi and Anne Reid as Alan and Celia.

The series has been praised for its depiction of the older generation, strong acting, and believable dialogue. A critic for The Daily Telegraph summarised the series as "a triumph against TV's ageism", and it has been endorsed by an executive member of the charity Age UK. Last Tango in Halifax accrued four nominations for the 2013 British Academy Television Awards and won the British Academy Television Award for Best Drama Series.

Overview
Celia Dawson and Alan Buttershaw are both widowed and in their 70s. They were attracted to each other in the 1950s, but never expressed their feelings, and Celia moved away with her parents. In the present day, they are reunited after being persuaded to join Facebook by their respective grandchildren. Alan has loved Celia since he was 16 years old, whilst Celia is described as a woman who is "unfulfilled" and was unhappily married to a man she grew to hate. After their reunion, Alan and Celia discover that they still feel as passionately for each other as they did when they were teenagers. Their story is described as a "testament of the uplifting power of love at any age".

Alan and Celia's romance is depicted alongside the troubles of their own grown daughters, and the series' official description says that its portrayal of family is "as dark as it is comic". Alan's daughter Gillian and Celia's daughter Caroline are complete opposites: widowed Gillian runs a farm and works part time in a supermarket, whilst Oxford-educated Caroline is the principal of an exclusive independent school. Their parents' engagement affects both daughters' lives. Gillian wonders how she and her son will cope without her father around to help, whilst Caroline, struggling with depression and her feelings for a female colleague, feels that her mother's unconventional romance gives her "permission to finally admit to being who she really is".

Production

Concept and writing
The series is based on lead writer Sally Wainwright's personal experiences. She described it as "the most personal thing I've ever written". Her mother, Dorothy, lost contact with a childhood friend, Alec Walker, when she was 15, but they reconnected on the social networking website Friends Reunited 60 years later and within six months were married. When she told the story to her colleague Nicola Shindler, Shindler suggested she turn her experience into a television series. Shindler became the series' executive producer.

Through Caroline, the series explores various LGBT themes. A source of contention for Celia is her daughter entering into a same sex relationship and later coming out to her. Anne Reid spoke positively of the storyline, stating that she believes a lot of people of her own generation are homophobic. She felt that her own character "might show them [and] might change them" just as Celia must become more accepting to avoid losing Alan. Jacobi concurred: Alan has "a streak of tolerance in him ... that perhaps Celia doesn't". In series three, the division between Celia and Caroline widens after Celia refuses to attend Caroline's wedding to her girlfriend. Wainwright felt that killing off Caroline's partner Kate would be the most effective way to propel the drama onwards and to develop the emotional lives of the remaining characters - however 'killing the lesbian' is well-known homophobic film trope. She was conflicted over this decision, having grown attached to the character of Kate, and actress Nina Sosanya, and wrote two versions of the fourth episode; the unaired one would have seen Kate survive.

Characters and casting

Discussing the casting of Derek Jacobi and Anne Reid, Wainwright stated: "we went for the best and we got them". The Guardian felt that one of the series' successes was the unlikely casting of a "theatrical knight" (Jacobi) and a "TV Stalwart" (Reid).

Jacobi was surprised to be offered the role of Alan; as his reputation centred on parts that were either "posh", "classical" or "costume". He enjoyed having the chance to play someone who is "an ordinary fellow". He also felt the series provided a chance to depict a "love story between two older characters that isn't patronising or stereotyped in any way".

Reid and Jacobi also influenced the creative process—after Reid discovered Jacobi could jive, they implored Wainright to include a dance scene in an episode. Jacobi also inspired a scene in which two of Alan's friends (played by Roy Barraclough and Paul Copley) vie to be his best man. A teenage version of Alan is portrayed in flashback by Nico Mirallegro.

Reid was Wainwright's personal choice for the role of Celia. Reid  hoped that Last Tango in Halifax would "give hope to older people".

Reid identified herself with Celia's personality – believing herself to be quite reckless and outgoing – though stated that unlike her character she has no desire to enter another relationship. Reid described filming the series as "one of the best times in my career" and stated that she was proud of the work put in. Amelia Young plays a teenage Celia during a flashback sequence in episode six.

Lancashire discerned that the series was "very special" within reading two pages of the script. Other factors that persuaded her to commit to the series included the casting of Reid and Jacobi, and the series' juxtaposition of a heart-warming story with elements of humour. In terms of her character, Lancashire identified with Caroline being "a working woman trying to keep everything under control". She stated the series' ensemble cast was "the closest I’ve come to being in a theatre company on television" due to how well the actors worked together.

The cast had all assumed that Last Tango in Halifax would only run for one series. Filming of the second series clashed with filming of the second series of the BBC One period drama The Paradise, which also starred Sarah Lancashire. This necessitated her having to leave her role in The Paradise halfway through the second series in order to reprise her role as Caroline in Last Tango in Halifax. In an interview in 2013 Lancashire stated that the decision to return to Last Tango in Halifax was the easiest she had made in her working life stating "as an actor you can wait an entire career to be involved in a project like this."

The role resulted in her receiving the most fan mail of her career. Lancashire was surprised and humbled by the responses from women stating that Caroline's same sex relationship had personally inspired them. She stated that in her approach to the character she did not focus on Caroline's sexuality, but the "humanity of her". Due to the underrepresentation of gay characters on television, Lancashire felt it particularly important that Caroline's experience would not be portrayed inaccurately. In 2014 Wainwright recalled being "blown away" by Lancashire's performances in the rushes for the series, which partly inspired her to script the series Happy Valley in which Lancashire plays the lead role.

Nicola Walker completes the main cast as Gillian. She admired the character's honesty, bravery and lack of self-pity, and identified strongly with her tendency to speak before thinking things through and her deep love for her father. In 2014 The Daily Telegraph described the role as a "game-changer" in the trajectory of Walker's career. Though ultimately successful in winning the role, Walker initially believed that she would not get the part due to a lack of confidence in her northern accent, and the presence of northern actresses in the audition.

Her approach to the character saw her delve into Gillian's psychology, with Walker particularly interested in the contradiction between Gillian's sexual confidence and her use of sex as a form of self-punishment.  She felt the series showed a very adult approach to storytelling, stating that she had "never come across a character like Gillian before" and praising the variety of strong female roles.

The Independent noted the significance of the series having three female leads over the age of 40, stating that this, alongside Caroline's lesbian storyline and Gillian's attitude towards sex made the series "quietly subversive" when compared against primetime television as a whole.

In addition to its main characters, Last Tango in Halifax features a regular supporting cast. Nina Sosanya plays Caroline's romantic partner Kate, whom she decides to marry over the course of the series. Gerard Gilbert of The Independent describes the relationship between the couple as "one of the most normalised lesbian relationships ever shown on the small screen." Nina Sosanya noted that she enjoyed filming with Sarah Lancashire and that the pair would "giggle a lot like completely juvenile idiots" whilst filming their love scenes.

Other characters introduced in the first series include Caroline's husband John (Tony Gardner) and his lover Judith (Ronni Ancona), Gillian's brother-in-law, Robbie (Dean Andrews), and Paul (Sacha Dhawan), a youth with whom Gillian has a sexual relationship. Josh Bolt plays Gillian's son Raff, whilst Edward Ashley and Louis Greatorex play Caroline's teenage sons William and Lawrence. The second series expanded the families of Alan and Celia. Timothy West appears as Alan's brother Ted whilst Gemma Jones plays Celia's sister Muriel. The third series later introduces Rupert Graves as Gary, who is revealed to be Alan's illegitimate son, and Michelle Hurst as Kate's mother Ginika.

Filming
The first series was filmed in Yorkshire and in Altrincham between January and April 2012. Altrincham was used to represent scenes set in Harrogate, such as those set at Caroline's house. The second series began filming in July 2013.  Filming took place at Holdsworth House in Halifax in August 2013 and also at Hoghton Tower, a fortified manor house in Lancashire, in August 2013. This resulted in the Tower's being closed to the public between 19 and 28 August. In September the University of York supplied ten students from the Department of Theatre, Film and Television to work as extras on the series. Filming for the third series began in Yorkshire and at Peover Hall, near Knutsford, Cheshire in July 2014.

In November 2017, explaining why the series had no starting date for filming its next series, a BBC spokesperson said "Sally [Wainwright] is presently engaged with another BBC project, but has every intention of revisiting Last Tango when she is able to." Wainwright's new period drama series, Gentleman Jack, was scheduled to air on BBC One in 2018, and she was also working on a third series of Happy Valley.

Episodes

Broadcast audiences

The series premièred to overnight ratings of 6.160 million viewers, 25.6% of the available audience, as the highest rated show at 9 pm on 20 November. The first series' finale, airing 19 December 2012, also won its time-slot, achieving an overnight series high of 6.290 million viewers, 26.6% of the available audience. Consolidated figures released by the Broadcasters' Audience Research Board (BARB) revealed that the series première achieved a consolidated rating of 7.304 million viewers, whilst the finale had 7.480 million. The overall series average in terms of viewing figures was 7.316 million viewers. The Independent reported that the early consolidated ratings received by the programme made it the highest rated new mid-week television drama of 2012. In September 2013, the series began airing on the American broadcast television network PBS.

Critical reception

Rotten Tomatoes critic ratings are 94% for Series 1 and 100% for Series 2 and 3.

The series has attracted mostly positive reviews, largely focused on the depiction of its two septuagenarian lead characters. Jane Shilling of The Daily Telegraph labelled the series "a triumph against TV's ageism" in an examination of the portrayal of elderly people in the media. Shilling singled out Jacobi and Reid's performances, stating that they provide a "mixture of gravity and levity" that "brings a transcendent quality to their characters' resolute ordinariness".

Lucy Harmer, an executive member of the charity Age UK, also praised the series for portraying two "normal, healthy and sane" older characters, citing the depiction of Internet use by the elderly as something ordinary. She compared the treatment of older characters in the series to Hilary Boyd's novel Thursdays in the Park and the film The Best Exotic Marigold Hotel (2012).

The Huffington Posts Caroline Frost thought the series was reminiscent of the dialogue and sensibility of the playwright Alan Bennett. She wrote the story was poignant and praised a central theme underlining "how many people make do with their day-to-day business and responsibilities, while still holding on to their private dreams".

Andrew Anthony of The Guardian had his "low expectations ... squarely confounded", giving particular praise to the dialogue and the central performances. Jane Simon of the Daily Mirror felt that Last Tango in Halifax experienced a mid-series dip, though she praised what she felt was a triumphant finale. She also praised Wainwright's script and the lead quartet of Jacobi, Reid, Lancashire, and Walker for creating "characters you can believe in even when they're behaving appallingly".

The series was reviewed favourably by the American website AfterEllen, which reports on the depiction of gay and bisexual women in the media. Correspondent Jill Guccini stated that she "started off watching this series thinking it was a cute little show about some oldies falling in love", but at the end of the series believed it was "some of the finest television I've seen, anywhere, ever".

Critical reception in the United States was also largely positive following PBS' acquisition of the show. Mary McNamara of the Los Angeles Times labelled the series as "the best new show of the fall", describing it as "a rapturous mix of absurdly fairy-tale-romance and frantic modern complications, set in the picturesque drear of Yorkshire and brought to life by masterfully shaded performances." She opined that Reid and Jacobi "are capable of doing more with a startled look or careful smile ... than most actors can do in seven pages of dialogue".

Matthew Gilbert of The Boston Globe acknowledged that the US public might not find the series appealing based on its title and premise alone, stating that PBS' description of the programme made it sound "as saccharine and hackneyed as a Geritol commercial". Upon viewing the series, however, he praised the added dimensions of the series and wrote that it was "so much more interesting" than the central premise suggested. He also felt that Walker and Lancashire played an important part, "both add[ing] a necessary amount of bitter to the sweet".

Mike Hale of The New York Times was more cynical about the series, describing it as a "warm comforter of a series" and "treacle". However, he felt that series also distinguished itself from this category of media by its "relatively dry style and careful modulation of tone and volume" in addition to "a crackerjack cast".

Accolades

The first series of Last Tango in Halifax was nominated for four awards at the 2013 British Academy Television Awards, which took place on 12 May 2013. Actors Derek Jacobi, Anne Reid, and Sarah Lancashire earned respective nominations in the Best Actor, Best Actress, and Best Supporting Actress categories. The series itself was nominated for  the British Academy Television Award for Best Drama Series, and ultimately won. Additionally, Wainwright was named best Drama Writer at the 2013 British Academy Television Craft Awards for her writing of the series. The series was nominated for Best Drama Series at the 2013 Broadcasting Press Guild Awards whilst Sally Wainwright was nominated for the writer's award for her contribution to both Last Tango in Halifax and Scott & Bailey.
In 2014, Sarah Lancashire and Nicola Walker were both nominated for a British Academy Television Award in the category for "Best Supporting Actress" for their roles in Last Tango in Halifax. Lancashire won the award for her role as Caroline.

Possible adaptations
In October 2013, it was reported in news outlets that American actress, screenwriter and producer Diane Keaton had acquired the rights to remake Last Tango in Halifax for American audiences on the subscription cable channel HBO. Sally Wainwright mentioned this development at a Broadcasting Press Guild event and stated that, though she did not expect to be closely involved in the remake, she would have an associate producer role. However, the following day Red Production Company released a statement stating that a remake would probably be delayed since the original series was still airing on American channel PBS. In April 2014, it was reported that the series would be remade for French television by BBC Worldwide France and the production company NEWEN.

Notes

References

External links

 Last Tango in Halifax on PBS

2012 British television series debuts
2020 British television series endings
2010s British drama television series
2020s British drama television series
BAFTA winners (television series)
BBC high definition shows
BBC television dramas
Television series by Red Production Company
British comedy-drama television shows
2010s British LGBT-related comedy television series
2020s British LGBT-related comedy television series
English-language television shows
Lesbian-related television shows
Television series about old age
Television series created by Sally Wainwright
Television shows set in West Yorkshire
2010s British LGBT-related drama television series
2020s British LGBT-related drama television series